The Enoggera Ward is a Brisbane City Council ward covering Enoggera, Gaythorne, Mitchelton, Newmarket, Wilston and parts of Alderley, Ashgrove, Grange, Keperra and Windsor.

Councillors for Enoggera Ward

Results

References 

City of Brisbane wards